The 2017 Charlottesville Men's Pro Challenger was a professional tennis tournament played on indoor hard courts. It was the ninth edition of the tournament which was part of the 2017 ATP Challenger Tour, taking place in Charlottesville, United States from October 30 to November 5, 2017.

Singles main-draw entrants

Seeds

 1 Rankings are as of October 23, 2017.

Other entrants
The following players received wildcards into the singles main draw:
  JC Aragone
  Ernesto Escobedo
  Thai-Son Kwiatkowski
  Ryan Shane
 
The following players received entry from the qualifying draw:
  Edward Corrie
  Jared Hiltzik
  Ruan Roelofse
  Alex Rybakov

The following player received entry as lucky losers:
  Samuel Monette
  Frederik Nielsen
  Neil Pauffley

Champions

Singles

 Tim Smyczek def.  Tennys Sandgren 6–7(5–7), 6–3, 6–2.

Doubles

 Denis Kudla /  Danny Thomas def.  Jarryd Chaplin /  Miķelis Lībietis 6–7(4–7), 1–4 ret.

References

Charlottesville Men's Pro Challenger
2017
Charlottesville Men's Pro Challenger
Charlottesville Men's Pro Challenger